The International Gymnastics Hall of Fame, located in Oklahoma City, USA, is a hall of fame dedicated to honoring the achievements and contributions of the world's greatest competitors, coaches and authorities in artistic gymnastics.

The early IGHOF was founded in 1972 by Frank Wells of the National Gymnastics Clinic. It had only one member, Olga Korbut, and disbanded in the late 1970s. The current museum was founded in 1986 by Glenn Sundby, publisher of the International Gymnast Magazine. Initially located in Oceanside, California, it was moved into Oklahoma City in 1997.

The museum is housed inside the Science Museum Oklahoma, formerly called the Omniplex.

List of inductees

References

External links

Artistic gymnastics
Gymnastics-related lists
Gym
Museums in Oklahoma City
Sports halls of fame
Sports museums in Oklahoma
Museums established in 1986
Awards established in 1986
1986 establishments in California
1997 establishments in Oklahoma